Turaneh (also Romanized as Tūrāneh and Towrāneh) is a village in Bala Velayat Rural District, Bala Velayat District, Bakharz County, Razavi Khorasan Province, Iran. At the 2006 census, its population was 1,188, in 256 families.

References 

Populated places in Bakharz County